Government Higher Secondary School Omalloor, also abbreviated as 'G.H.S.S. Omalloor' and locally referred to as 'Thalakanjiram school', is a state school in Omalloor, Pathanamthitta in Kerala, India, that follows the state syllabus with Malayalam as the instruction medium. The school was founded in 1905.

See also
 Pathanamthitta District

References

External links 

Schools in Pathanamthitta district